Slaughter is a 2009 American horror film written and directed by Stewart Hopewell. It was part of the third After Dark Horrorfest.

Plot
Faith (Amy Shiels) is a young woman trapped in a relationship with her abusive boyfriend, Jimmy (Vance Daniels).  She flees from him and moves to Atlanta to start over again.  As Faith begins her new life, she meets a fun and free-spirited young woman named Lola (Lucy Holt).  Lola lives on a farm with her controlling father, Jorgen (David Sterne), her older brother, and her younger brother.  Faith and Lola become good friends, and Lola invites Faith to live with her and her family to help out with the farm work.  During the day, the family (and Faith) work on the farm, and at night the two young women go out on the town to party in Atlanta.  Lola brings home a different man every night.  Eventually Faith notices that these men disappear after their encounters with Lola, and she suspects that Lola's father is murdering them in the farm's slaughterhouse.

Cast
 Amy Shiels Faith 
 David Sterne Jorgen 
 Lucy Holt as Lola 
 Vance Daniels Jimmy
 CJ Singer Arvin

Production
The film was originally titled Faithless.  It was shot in Romania, where two of the producers had a strong working relationship.  The script was originally written in 2006, but it was not produced until later, when a producer became  associated with After Dark.  It was based on a true story from 100 years ago that was modernized.

Reception
Slaughter received negative reviews.  Joshua Siebalt of Dread Central rated the film 0.5/5 stars and called it "the single most boring film I have ever seen on the big screen from any genre."  Dennis Harvey of Variety wrote that the film tests horror fans' patience with its long buildup, but the climax is grisly enough to satisfy them.  David Johnson of DVD Verdict called it "a mediocre outing" with a few memorable scenes.  Cameron McGaughy of DVD Talk rated it 1/5 stars and wrote that it fails to deliver on its exploitative title.

References

External links
 

2009 films
2009 horror films
Films set in Atlanta
Films set on farms
American horror films
Films scored by Justin Burnett
Films shot in Romania
2000s English-language films
2000s American films